Albin is a French, German, and English surname. Notable people with the surname include:

 Adolf Albin (1848–1920), Romanian chess player
 Barry T. Albin (born 1952), American judge 
 Eleazar Albin (1680–1742), British naturalist and painter
 Emiliano Albín (born 1989), Uruguayan footballer
 Facundo Albin (born 1992), Argentine motorbike racer
 Fred Albin (1903–1968), American sound engineer
 Hans Albin (1905–1988), German actor and film producer
 Henry Albin (1624–1696), English minister
 Igor Albin (born 1966), Russian politician 
 Juan Angel Albín (born 1986), Uruguayan footballer
 Peter S. Albin (1934–2008), American economist
 Susan Albin, American industrial engineer
 Tim Albin (born 1965), American football coach

See also
 Alexandre Rousselin de Saint-Albin (1773–1847), French politician

French-language surnames
German-language surnames
English-language surnames